Paraclinus barbatus, the Goatee blenny, is a species of labrisomid blenny native to reefs of the western Atlantic Ocean and the Caribbean Sea.  It can reach a length of  TL.

References

barbatus
Fish described in 1955
Taxa named by Victor G. Springer